David de Freitas (born 30 September 1979) is a French former professional footballer who played as a midfielder. He was most recently the head coach of UMS Montélimar.

Honours
Beauvais
 Championnat National: 2000

References

External links
 

Living people
1979 births
French footballers
Association football midfielders
Ligue 1 players
Ligue 2 players
FC Nantes players
Amiens SC players
Grenoble Foot 38 players
AS Beauvais Oise players
Angers SCO players
LB Châteauroux players